Thuiaria articulata, the jointed hydroid or sea spleenwort, is a branching colonial hydroid in the family Sertulariidae.

Description
Jointed hydroids look like a child's drawing of a Christmas tree. They have an upright stem with side branches that emerge in pairs and extend upwards from the 'trunk'. The branches all grow in one plane. The colony is usually 4–8 cm in total height but may grow to 22 cm.

Distribution
This colonial animal is found off the length of the South African coast down to 135m under water. It is also found at Vema Seamount.

Ecology
Jointed hydroids live in sheltered areas and are common on the southern Cape coast. The reproductive bodies are ovoid with a distinct depression in their apex.

Synonyms
The following species are considered synonyms of Thuiaria articulata:
Dymella articulata (Pallas, 1766) (synonym)
Salacia articulata (Pallas, 1766) (Synonym)
Sertularia articulata Pallas, 1766 (basionym)
Sertularia lonchitis Ellis & Solander, 1786 (synonym)
Thuiaria barentsi Naumov, 1960 (synonym)
Thuiaria lichenastrum (Linnaeus, 1758) (synonym)
Thuiaria lonchitis (Ellis & Solander, 1786) (synonym)

References

Sertulariidae
Animals described in 1766
Taxa named by Peter Simon Pallas